is a Japanese manga series written and illustrated by Ichimaru. It was serialized in Shogakukan's seinen manga magazine Big Comic Original from 1990 to 1999, with its chapters collected in 17 tankōbon volumes. It was followed by a sequel, Okami-san Heisei Basho, serialized in the same magazine from 2011 to 2013, with its chapters collected in two tankōbon volumes. The series is about a woman who becomes the manager of a stable of sumo wrestlers.

In 1993, Okami-san won the 38th Shogakukan Manga Award in the general category.

Publication
Shogakukan collected its chapters in seventeen tankōbon volumes, released from August 30, 1991, to March 30, 1999.

A sequel, titled , was serialized for sixteen chapters in the same magazine from October 20, 2011, to September 5, 2013. Two tankōbon volumes were released on February 28 and December 27, 2013.

Volume list

Okami-san

Okami-san Heisei Basho

Reception
In 1993, alongside Hideki Arai's Miyamoto kara Kimi e, Okami-san won the 38th Shogakukan Manga Award in the general category.

References

External links
  

Comedy anime and manga
Seinen manga
Shogakukan manga
Slice of life anime and manga
Sumo anime and manga
Winners of the Shogakukan Manga Award for general manga